Michael Lee Matthews (born October 9, 1983) is a former American football tight end for the New York Giants. He was signed as an undrafted free agent in 2007. He played college football at Georgia Tech.

Matthews earned a Super Bowl ring with the Giants in Super Bowl XLII. He was also a member of the New England Patriots, Detroit Lions, Buffalo Bills, Indianapolis Colts, and Virginia Destroyers.

Early years
Matthews attended Sycamore High School in Cincinnati, Ohio and was a student and a letterman in football, basketball, Track, and baseball. In football, he was named as a first-team All-City selection, a second-team All-District selection, and a first-team All-Conference selection. Michael Matthews graduated from Sycamore High School in 2002.

College years
Matthews played collegiately for the Georgia Tech football team

Professional career

New York Giants
Matthews was signed by the Giants as an undrafted free agent in 2007. Matthews played in every game for the Giants in the 2007 season as a backup tight end behind Jeremy Shockey and Kevin Boss, in which he was an important contributor to the team's rushing attack with his strong blocking. Matthews went on to win Super Bowl XLII with the Giants; he started the game with Boss in a double tight end formation.

Matthews returned to the Giants to serve as the backup tight end behind Kevin Boss in 2008. Matthews was typically used as a blocking tight end, with Boss being the receiving tight end.

New England Patriots
Matthews was traded to the New England Patriots on September 5, 2009, in exchange for a conditional 2011 draft pick. He was waived on October 20; the condition for the trade was not met, meaning the Patriots did not surrender a draft choice.

Detroit Lions
Matthews was signed by the Detroit Lions on December 15, 2009. He was waived on April 20, 2010.

Buffalo Bills
Matthews signed with the Buffalo Bills on April 21, 2010. He was injury waived on August 23.

Virginia Destroyers
Matthews was signed by the Virginia Destroyers of the United Football League on May 19, 2011.

Indianapolis Colts
On August 9, 2011, Matthews signed with the Indianapolis Colts.

References

External links
Just Sports stats
Georgia Tech Yellow Jackets bio
New England Patriots bio
New York Giants bio

1983 births
Living people
Players of American football from Cincinnati
American football tight ends
Georgia Tech Yellow Jackets football players
New York Giants players
New England Patriots players
Detroit Lions players
Buffalo Bills players
Virginia Destroyers players
Indianapolis Colts players